Alexis Martín Arias (born 4 July 1992) is an Argentine professional footballer who plays as a goalkeeper for O'Higgins.

Career
Martín Arias began his career with Gimnasia y Esgrima, firstly in the youth system from 2007. He made his professional debut for the club in a Copa Argentina tie against Deportivo Madryn on 18 May 2016, prior to making his league bow in the final match of the 2016 Argentine Primera División season as he played the full ninety minutes in a 3–0 win at home to Colón. In the following campaign, 2016–17, Martín Arias made thirty appearances as Gimnasia y Esgrima finished 13th. In January 2020, Martín Arias moved abroad to Chile with Unión La Calera.

Career statistics
.

References

External links

1992 births
Living people
Sportspeople from Buenos Aires Province
Argentine footballers
Association football goalkeepers
Argentine expatriate footballers
Expatriate footballers in Chile
Argentine expatriate sportspeople in Chile
Argentine Primera División players
Chilean Primera División players
Club de Gimnasia y Esgrima La Plata footballers
Unión La Calera footballers